Camillo Girotti (born 27 February 1918) was an Italian professional football player.

Honours
 Coppa Italia winner: 1938/39.

1918 births
Year of death missing
Italian footballers
Serie A players
Serie B players
Calcio Lecco 1912 players
Inter Milan players
Parma Calcio 1913 players
Association football defenders